Eggella is a shield volcano in central Kamchatka. The volcano is located on the west axis of the southern Sredinny Range.

See also
 List of volcanoes in Russia

References

Volcanoes of the Kamchatka Peninsula
Mountains of the Kamchatka Peninsula
Shield volcanoes of Russia
Holocene shield volcanoes
Holocene Asia